Hansruedi Beugger (15 July 1930 – 30 March 2020) was a Swiss bobsledder. He competed in the four-man event at the 1964 Winter Olympics.

References

External links
 

1930 births
2020 deaths
Swiss male bobsledders
Olympic bobsledders of Switzerland
Bobsledders at the 1964 Winter Olympics
Place of birth missing
20th-century Swiss people